George Skuodas (born 16 August 1970) is a British sailor. He competed in the Star event at the 1996 Summer Olympics.

References

External links
 

1970 births
Living people
British male sailors (sport)
Olympic sailors of Great Britain
Sailors at the 1996 Summer Olympics – Star
People from Helensburgh